The 2016 World Ladies Snooker Championship was a women's snooker tournament that took place at the Northern Snooker Centre in Leeds, England, from 2 to 5 April 2016. The event was the 2016 edition of the World Women's Snooker Championship first held in 1976.

The event was won by Reanne Evans, who defeated defending champion Ng On-yee 6–4 in the final.

Background 
The event was hosted at the Northern Snooker Centre, Leeds. Qualifying featured five groups of five or six players each with eight players qualifying for the main tournament. Those players met eight seeded players in the last-16 knockout round. After the group stage, the players not reaching the main knockout tournament competed in a parallel "Plate" tournament. Matches in the group stage were best-of-three-.

The first knockout round was best-of-five-frames; the quarter-finals and semi-finals best-of-seven, and the final was played as a best-of-11 match.

Forty-one players from thirteen different countries participated in the tournament, as listed in the table below. Numbers in brackets show the eight seeded players. Although Ng On-yee was the defending champion, Reanne Evans was the highest seed.

Prize money 
The winner of the event won a total of £1,200.

Winner: £1,200 
Runner-up: £600
Losing semi-finalists: £300
Losing quarter-finalists: £150
Last 16 losers: £80
Highest Break (72, Ng On-yee) £100

Summary

Group stage 
There were three groups of six players and three groups of five players. The top eight seeds were placed into the last-16 round of the knockout phase and were not required to play in the qualifying groups. Progression from the groups was determined by the following criteria: Matches won; Head to head; frames won; Highest ; and finally by ranking position. The event was split after the group stage, with players not reaching the main knockout tournament competing in a parallel tournament called the plate competition.

The only player to complete their qualifying matches without losing a frame was Chitra Magimairaj. Two players qualified whilst only losing one frame each: Jessica Woods and Kathy Howden. Lauren Carley, Ronda Sheldreck, and Sandra Bryan all failed to win any frames.

Knockout 
Three of the eight seeds lost in the last-16: Maria Catalano, Jaique Ip (seeded 3rd), Maria Catalano (4th) and Jenny Poulter (6th). Ng On-yee progressed to the final without losing a frame, beating Laura Evans 3–0, Katrina Wan 4–0 and Rebecca Kenna 4–0. Reanne Evans whitewashed Diana Schuler 3–0 then beat 2015 runner-up Emma Bonney 4–2 and Tatjana Vasiljeva 4–1. Kenna was the only unseeded player to reach as far as the semi-finals before losing to On-yee.

Final
The final took place on 5 April 2016, and was contested by defending champion Ng On-yee and top seed Reanne Evans. Evans won the first frame, before  Ng took the next three, making the highest break of the competition, 72, in the fourth frame. Evans then took the next two frames to level the match at 3–3. Ng regained the lead again at 4–3, before Evans won three in a row to win the match 6–4, including a break of 47 in frame ten.

The victory for Evan was her 11th world championship win in the previous 12 years.

Ng played Peter Lines in 2016 World Snooker Championship qualifying the Wednesday after the final, however, she lost 1–10.

Breaks 
There were only five breaks of over 50, by just three players. The highest break of the tournament was 72 by Ng On-yee, who also recorded a 52. Reanne Evans compiled a 68 and a 59. Michelle Brown made a 55.

Results

Group stage matches 
Players who qualified from the group are shown in bold and with a (Q) after their name in the final standings tables below.

Knockout stage
Seedings are shown in brackets. Players listed in bold indicate match winner.

Final

Plate competition
The Plate competition was for players who did not reach the main knockout draw. It was won by Varshaa Sanjeev. The only breaks over 30 were a 35 by Suzie Opacic and a 34 by Sanjeev.

Players listed in bold indicate match winner.

Other events 
Apart from the plate competition, a number of other events took place around the World Championship.

Seniors Final: Chitra Magimairaj 3–0 Sharon Kaur (The Seniors event was held on 31 March 2016)
Under-21 Winner: Varshaa Sanjeev 3–0 Jeong Min Park (The Under-21 event was held from 3 to 5 April 2016)
Women's Doubles Final: Ng On-yee and Katrina Wan 4–1 Maria Catalano and Tatjana Vasiljeva
Mixed Doubles Final: Jaique Ip and Cheung Ka Wai 4–3 Maria Catalano and Eden Sharav

References

External links 
Ng On Yee Previews World Title Defence – 3 April 2016 (YouTube video)
Reanne Evans reacts to 11th world title – 5 April 2016 (YouTube video)
Republic of Ireland Ladies Snooker Association article

World Women's Snooker Championship
World Women's Championship
World Women's Snooker Championship
World Snooker Championship
International sports competitions hosted by England
Sports competitions in Leeds
World Women's Snooker Championship